Andrew John Parsons (born 30 November 1966) is an English comedian and writer. He regularly appeared on Mock the Week from Series 3 to Series 14. With comedy partner Henry Naylor, he has written and presented nine series of Parsons and Naylor's Pull-Out Sections for BBC Radio 2.

Early life
Parsons was born in Weymouth, Dorset. He attended Parc Eglos Primary School, Helston Comprehensive School in Cornwall and Churston Ferrers Grammar School, Torbay (Devon) before going to Christ's College, Cambridge to study Law, where he met and formed a double act with Henry Naylor which twice toured with the National Student Theatre Company and once with the Footlights. After completing his studies, Parsons got a job working as a legal clerk on a case at the Greenock shipyards, which he describes as "the most tedious thing I'd ever done." With Naylor he established TBA, London's first sketch comedy club.

Writing/television
His first TV writing job was for Spitting Image and he went on to become one of the main writers. He has also appeared as a guest on They Think It's All Over, QI, and BBC Radio 5 Live's Fighting Talk. Parsons left Mock the Week in October 2015 after nine series as a regular panelist, missing only five episodes. He, like the other regular panellists on Mock the Week, kept the same seat throughout the series, Parsons being the one on host Dara Ó Briain's left.

He has also presented The PMQ show on BBC Radio 5 Live and was a regular during the 2010 World Cup on the BBC Radio 2 show Never Write Off The Germans.

Parsons also appeared in World's Most Dangerous Roads alongside Ed Byrne, travelling along the Road of Bones in Siberia, visiting the coldest inhabited place on Earth and sleeping in a tent at -53 °C.

After writing for Week Ending, Parsons and Naylor were offered their own show Parsons and Naylor's Pull-Out Sections in 2001. They have also performed live versions of the show at the Edinburgh Festival Fringe (1993–2001) and at international comedy festivals in Sydney (1998/99), Melbourne and Adelaide (both 1998).

Stand-up comedy
Parsons regularly performs solo shows at comedy festivals, and also at The Comedy Store. He is the Time Out Comedy Award Winner 2002.

In 2008, he co-wrote and starred in a BBC Radio 4 sitcom called The Lost Weblog of Scrooby Trevithick and a second series, Scrooby Trevithick, aired in 2010. He toured in the UK with his show Andy Parsons: Citizens! in 2009. The show was recorded at the Lyric Theatre, London on 28 September 2009 and released on DVD in November that year under the title Britain's Got Idiots which was shown on BBC2 in October & December 2010.

In 2010, Parsons took part in Channel 4's Comedy Gala, a benefit show held in aid of Great Ormond Street Children's Hospital, filmed live at the O2 Arena in London on 30 March.

His 2011 UK National Tour was called Gruntled. and his 2013 tour was called I've Got A Shed. His third DVD Slacktivist was released on 25 November 2013 and was televised on BBC Two in December 2014.

His 2015 tour was entitled Live & Unleashed - But Naturally Cautious. Also in 2015 Andy started the Slacktivist Action Group. Occurring monthly with MPs, journalists, experts and comedians.

2017 brought the new tour Peak Bullsh*t.

His most recent tour is called Healing The Nation and ran from September to December 2019, then resumed, with new material, in September 2021.

Activism
Parsons backed the People's Vote, a campaign group that called for a public vote on the final Brexit deal between the UK and the European Union.

Stand-up DVDs

References

External links
 
 Artists Page on Agents Website
 
 Review of Eat my Satire
 
 
 Chortle Andy Parsons' biography and his forthcoming gigs

1966 births
English male comedians
English stand-up comedians
English television writers
English satirists
People from Weymouth, Dorset
Living people
Alumni of Christ's College, Cambridge
People educated at Churston Ferrers Grammar School
20th-century English comedians
21st-century English comedians
British male television writers